Sobeknakht I was an ancient Egyptian official of the Second Intermediate Period. He was local governor at Elkab.

Biography
Sobeknakht I started his career as a King's Son and Overseer of the gs-pr. Later, he became Governor of Elkab.

The overseer of the gs-pr was a royal estate manager in provinces often associated with the overseer of the sealed things (treasury), and was also connected to future governors.

Attestation
Sobeknakht I is mainly known from two sources; the Juridical Stele and tomb inscriptions.

Juridical Stela
The Juridical Stela documents the transfer of the Governorship of Elkab from a certain Kebsi to a relative, Sobeknakht I, in Year 01 of king Nebiriau. Kebsi had inherited this office from his father Iymeru when the latter became vizier. Iymeru had in turn inherited it from his elder brother Aya junior, who died prematurely without children. Prior to this, Aya Junior had inherited the office from their father Aya who became vizier in Year 01 of Merhotepre.

Elkab Tomb Inscription
Sobeknakht I is known from the inscriptions in the tomb of the local governor Sobeknakht II as the father of the latter. Furthermore, from these inscriptions it is clear that the wife of Sobeknakht I was a woman with the title hereditary princess and the name Nofru. Only recently his tomb was identified at Elkab. The inscriptions in the tomb are only badly preserved, but the mentioning of a woman called Nofru and remains of titles typical for local governors make the identification very likely.

References 

Nomarchs
People of the Sixteenth Dynasty of Egypt
Officials of the Seventeenth Dynasty of Egypt